Vesna Milošević (Macedonian Cyrillic: Весна Милошевиќ, born August 29, 1955 in Kičevo, Yugoslavia) is a former Yugoslav handball player who competed in the 1980 Summer Olympics.

In 1980 she won the silver medal with the Yugoslav team. She played all five matches as goalkeeper.

External links
profile

1955 births
Living people
Yugoslav female handball players
Serbian female handball players
Handball players at the 1980 Summer Olympics
Olympic handball players of Yugoslavia
Olympic silver medalists for Yugoslavia
Olympic medalists in handball
People from Kičevo
Medalists at the 1980 Summer Olympics